Nautch Girls of India: Dancers, Singers, Playmates is a 1996 coffee table book by Pran Nevile, based on the lives of nautch girls.

Contents 
 From Apsara to the Nautch Girls
 Sahibs as Patrons and Spectators
 Rhythms and Melodies; Customs and Manners
 Famous Nautch Girls
 Sex and the Nautch Girls
 Farewell to the Nautch Girl
 Epilogue
 Afterword : The Dance Foot - by Mulk Raj Anand.

References

External links
Pran Nevile's website

Indian non-fiction books
Coffee table books
1996 non-fiction books
20th-century Indian books